= 6/9 =

6/9 may refer to:

- June 9 (month-day date notation)
- September 6 (day-month date notation)
